Ashley Daniel Walsh (born 11 January 1988) is a former Australian racing driver.

Not to be confused with the beast Ash Walshe, world record holder in deadlift, and star of various movies.

Karting
Walsh was a dual Australian Karting Champion in 2003 at his local Ipswich Kart Track driving a Tony Kart. He won the Junior Clubman and Junior Piston Port categories. He also won the 2004 Australian CIK Karting Championships in a Trulli Kart/IAME Parilla with Remo Racing. Walsh took up motor racing in 1999 by racing karts at the Ipswich Kart Club.

Formula Racing
Walsh was part of the CAMS Rising Stars program for 2007 when he was runner-up in the 2007 Australian Formula Ford Championship whilst racing for Borland Racing Developments. In 2008 Walsh competed in the Formula Renault 2.0 West European Cup (WEC) for Hitech Junior. Walsh finished 4th in the 2010 Genuine Ford Parts Australian Formula Ford Championship. Walsh only competed in limited races in 2009, including the final two rounds of the Australian Formula Ford Championship. Walsh was also the Rookie Driver for Australia in the A1 Grand Prix Series.

Touring Cars
In February 2011 he finished 16th in the 2011 Armor All Bathurst 12 Hour driving a Ryan McLeod run HSV VXR Turbo and then moved into the 2011 Fujitsu V8 Supercar Series with the newly expanded Miles Racing. Walsh moved to Matt Stone Racing for the 2012 Dunlop Series and immediately achieved regular top-five finishes.

Walsh contested the 2015 V8 Supercars Championship for Erebus Motorsport in a Mercedes-Benz E63 AMG before and including the 2015 ITM 500 Auckland, after which he was dropped in favour of experienced drivers Dean Canto and Alex Davison. He contested the 2016 Enduro Cup with Tim Slade at Brad Jones Racing, finishing 7th at Bathurst despite dropping two laps down early in the race with a brake fire.

Career results

Karting career summary

Circuit career

† Team result

Complete A1 Grand Prix results
(key) (Races in bold indicate pole position) (Races in italics indicate fastest lap)

Complete Bathurst 12 Hour results

Supercars Championship results

Complete Bathurst 1000 results

‡Walsh was entered as a co-driver to Slade but withdrew and was replaced with Heimgartner.

References

External links 
 Official Webpage
 
 Ashley Walsh profile on US Racing Reference
 Formula Ford Profile
 A1GP Info Page

1988 births
A1 Grand Prix Rookie drivers
Formula Ford drivers
Formula Renault 2.0 WEC drivers
Living people
Sportspeople from Ipswich, Queensland
Racing drivers from Queensland
Supercars Championship drivers
V8SuperTourer drivers
Dick Johnson Racing drivers
Matt Stone Racing drivers
Aston Martin Racing drivers